Inezia may refer to:
Inezia (bird), a genus of birds in the family Tyrannidae.
Inezia (plant), a genus of flower in the family Asteraceae.